Parasteatoda tepidariorum, the common house spider or American house spider, is a spider species of the genus Parasteatoda with a cosmopolitan distribution. Common house spiders are synanthropic and live in and near human dwellings. Their prey mechanism is similar to that of the other cobweb spiders: the spider follows disturbances transmitted along the web to entangle and then paralyze its prey, which usually consists of household insects and other invertebrates (often considered as pests).

Description

Appearance
Common house spiders are variable in color from tan to nearly black, frequently with patterns of differing shades on their body. They can be an inch (2.5 cm) or more across with legs outspread. P. tepidariorum is similar in body shape to widow spiders. Males have a less bulbous abdomen than females. Common house spiders' size and coloration allow the spiders to blend into the background and escape notice.

Life cycle
This species can live for more than a year after reaching maturity. Females suspend their egg sacs in their webs; the spherical egg sacs have a tan papery outer layer. Each egg sac contains from 150200 eggs, with a single female producing 1520 egg sacs in its lifetime. The spiderlings remain in the mother's web for several days after coming out of the egg sac.

Diet and predation
Common house spiders usually feed on small insects and household pests such as flies, mosquitoes, ants and wasps. They can randomly attack grasshoppers, butterflies, cockroaches or other spiders depending on their size. If the prey is too agile, the spider will try shooting web at it from a distance before pulling the thread toward itself. Bigger females can also attract baby skinks inside their web by leaving fly remains hanging in it. Once its food dries out, the spider usually drops it to the floor in order to free space in its web, instead of destroying and rebuilding it or changing its location.

Three spider species usually prey upon them: the pirate spiders of the genus Mimetus (Mimetidae), as well as two jumping spider species – Phidippus variegatus and Metacyrba undata. The latter one often falls prey to its own food when it gets trapped in the tangling web after missing the jump on its target. 

The assassin bug Stenolemus lanipes (Emesinae) apparently feeds exclusively on spiderlings of this species, but can also become prey of the adult spider.

Behavior

Interaction with other spiders

A male and female often share the same web for long periods, and several females often build their webs in close proximity. However, females will sometimes fight when they encounter each other.

Interaction with humans and predators
As these spiders live in constant proximity to humans, they are not usually aggressive and will even let a human hand approach their web. Common house spiders will bite humans only in self-defense, when grabbed and squeezed. The species' synanthropic habits, however, increase the risk of human bites.

Common house spiders possess poor vision and cannot detect any movement more than three to four inches away. If cornered, they will feign death as last resort.

Toxicity
Common house spiders have neurotoxic venom. However, their bites are less severe than that of other theridiids and are "not known to be dangerous to humans".

Subspecies 
Subspecies include P. tepidariorum australis (common gray house spider).

See also 

 House spider (listing other spiders known as "house spiders")

References

External links

  (2000): Achaearanea tepidariorum at Animal Diversity Web

Theridiidae
Spiders described in 1841
Spiders of North America
Spiders of South America
Taxa named by Carl Ludwig Koch